3D textiles are three-dimensional structures made with different manufacturing methods such as weaving, knitting, braiding, or nonwoven, or made with alternative technologies. 3D textiles are produced with three planar geometry, opposed to 2D textiles that are made on two planes. The weave in 2D textiles is perpendicular. The yarn is fed along two axis: length (x-axis) and width (y-axis), while 3D textiles also have a perpendicular weave, but they have an extra yarn with an angular feeding (z-axis) which creates thickness. 3D weaves are orthogonal weave structures, multilayer structures, and angle interlocks. 3D textiles have more manufacturing opportunities, various properties, and a broader scope of applications. These textiles have a wide range of applications, but they are most commonly used where performance is the primary criterion, such as technical textiles. Composite materials, manufacturing is one of the significant areas of using 3D textiles.

3D structures have two kinds of structural formations, i.e., hollow and solid.

Types 
3D fabrics can be formed with 3D weaving, 3D knitting, 3D braiding, non-woven methods and with many newer technologies, such as 3D printing, etc.

3D weaving 
There are several types of 3D woven fabrics that are commercially available; they can be classified according to their weaving technique.

 3D woven interlock fabrics, are 3D woven fabrics produced on a traditional 2D weaving loom, using proper weave design and techniques, it could either have the weaver/z-yarn going through all the thickness of the fabric or from layer to layer.
 3D orthogonal woven fabrics, are 3D woven fabrics produced on a special 3D weaving loom. The process to form such fabric was patented by Mohamed and Zhang. The architecture of the 3D orthogonal woven fabric consists of three different sets of yarns; warp yarns (y-yarn), weft yarns (x-yarn), and (z-yarn). The Z - yarn is placed in the through-thickness direction of the preform. In 3D orthogonal woven fabrics there is no interlacing  between the warp and weft yarns and they are straight and perpendicular to each other. On the other hand, z-yarns combine the warp and the weft layers by interlacing (moving up and down) along the y-direction over the weft yarn. Interlacing occurs on the top and the bottom surface of the fabric.

Advantages 

 3D orthogonal woven fabrics have less or no yarn crimp (the difference in length of yarn, before and after weaving); therefore, mechanical properties of fibers are almost fully used in warp and weft directions. Thus, it could benefit from the maximum load carrying capacity of high performance fibers in these directions.
 There is no need for layering to create a part, because the single fabric has a considerable thickness that provides the full three-dimensional reinforcement.

3D knitting 
3D knitting is a method of forming an article of clothing directly from the yarns. Typical examples are socks and one piece tights. 3D knitted fabrics are also used for the production of certain reinforcement structures.

3D braiding

Nonwoven 
Non-woven 3D fabrics are made of short fibers (natural and cut filaments of synthetic yarn). They are comparatively less successful.

3D printing

Additive manufacturing 
Fabric manufacturing by three-dimensional printer employs additive manufacturing, also known as additive layer manufacturing (ALM), a CAD-aided manufacturing technique that builds the object layer by layer.

3D printing has entered the world of clothing, with fashion designers experimenting with 3D-printed bikinis, shoes, and dresses.

Bikini 
"N-12" is a nylon bikini that was 3D printed by Shapeways.

Footwear and accessories 
Nike is using 3D printing to prototype and manufacture the 2012 Vapor Laser Talon football shoe for players of American football, and New Balance is 3D manufacturing custom-fit shoes for athletes. ''Vapor Laser Talon boots'' has 3D-printed footplates. ''Futurecraft STRUNG'' is another 3D printed variant belongs to Adidas.

Dresses 
Though very expensive, the 3D printer also printed a dress. Dita Von Teese wore a 3D printed gown with a fibonacci sequence that was designed by Michael Schmidt and the architect, Francis Bitonti.

Auxetic textiles 
Auxetic materials are materials which expand when stretched. They have the ability to be thicker when stretched. Fibers, yarns, and fabrics with auxetic properties are known as auxetic textiles. There are certain types of needle-punched nonwovens. 3D printers are also helpful in making auxetic materials for textiles. These fabrics have advanced properties that are useful in making various composite materials and high-performance applications.

Use 
Auxetic textiles are used in protective clothing, upholstery, sports, filtration, body armor, bulletproof vests (because of shock absorbing properties),  etc.

Applications 

Other applications of 3D textiles are:

Composite materials 

3D textiles are primarily used in manufacturing textile structural composites that are usable in military and construction.

Medical textiles
3D textiles in medical textiles contribute to the following sectors:

Wound care
In treating a wound over time by creating a favorable environment for healing, using both direct and indirect approaches, as well as preventing skin disintegration. Examples include 3D spacer fabrics.

Vascular grafting

Tissue engineering

Implants 

Medical textiles use tubular fabrics with carefully chosen materials that are biocompatible, nonallergic, and nontoxic. For example, Dyneema, PTFE, Polyester, and Teflon are used for implants. The material type varies depending on the implant area; for example, PTFE is preferred for stent implants due to its nonstick properties, while polyolefin is used for mesh implants.
Aerospace and automobile industry
 Shoes
 Filteration
 Construction industry

References 

Textiles